Madonna and Child with Saint Roch and Saint Sebastian is an oil-on-canvas painting by Lorenzo Lotto, created c. 1518, now in the National Gallery of Canada in Ottawa. On the left is Saint Roch and to the right is Saint Sebastian.

It was commissioned by Lotto's friend Battista Cucchi, one of several surgeons active in Bergamo and nicknamed 'Battista degli Organi' (Battista of the Organs). In his will of 1533 he left it to Lucrezia de Tirabuschis (Tiraboschi), a nun in the convent of Santa Grata on via Arena, where it remained until 1798. It was mentioned in Carlo Ridolfi's Le Meraviglie dell'Arte (1648), by Donato Calvi in Effemeride sagro profana di quanto di memorabile sia successo in Bergamo and by Francesco Tassi. 

The convent was under threat of closure in the late 18th century and feared having the painting confiscated when it was suppressed. It therefore sold the work in 1798 at a low price to abbot Giovanni Ghidini, who did not catalogue it. His great-grandson Nicola Ghidini gave it to the Piccinelli collection in Seriate in 1864. Ercole Piccinelli later sold it to Alessandro Contini Bonacossi for 180,000 lire. Contini's heirs offered it to the Uffizi, but when it was refused sold it instead to its present owners in 1976.

References

1518 paintings
Roch and Sebastian
Collections of the National Gallery of Canada
Paintings of Saint Sebastian
Paintings of Saint Roch